The 17th National Geographic Bee was held in Washington, D.C., on May 25, 2005, sponsored by the National Geographic Society. The final competition was moderated by Jeopardy! host Alex Trebek. The winner was Nathan Cornelius, a homeschooled student from Cottonwood, Minnesota, who won a $25,000 college scholarship and lifetime membership in the National Geographic Society. The 2nd-place winner, Karan Takhar of the Gordon School in East Providence, Rhode Island, won a $15,000 scholarship. The 3rd-place winner, Samuel Brandt of Roosevelt Middle School in Eugene, Oregon, won a $10,000 scholarship.

References

External links
 National Geographic Bee Official Website

National Geographic Bee